Matthias Bachinger and Denis Gremelmayr were the defending champions, but decided not to participate.

Martin Emmrich and Björn Phau won the final defeating Federico del Bonis and Horacio Zeballos 7–6(4), 6–2.

Seeds

Draw

Draw

References
 Main Draw

Marburg Open - Doubles
2011 Doubles